Alex Everett (born 15 October 1996) is a Welsh rugby union player, currently playing for United Rugby Championship side Cardiff. His preferred position is flanker.

Cardiff
Everett was called into Cardiff's European squad ahead of their European campaign. He made his debut for Cardiff in the first round of the 2021–22 European Rugby Champions Cup against  coming on as a replacement.

References

1996 births
Living people
Welsh rugby union players
Cardiff Rugby players
Rugby union flankers